Posturbanism Art Project is an conceptual project and art movement articulated and developed by the artist Alexey Parygin, which gave impetus to the formation of the social and philosophical utopian theory of Posturbanism.

History

Posturbanism Art Project is the artist’s third philosophical manifesto, a continuation of previous big works: Contemplation of Money (1996–2000), Art in the Forest (2000–2005), Art is a Business (2000–2015).

Since 2000, Parygin has been developing the utopian concept of the form of art after the death of art—PostUrbanism. The term posturbanism was publicly introduced by the artist in a manifesto published in the fall of 2010.

In a 2018 article, The Idea and the Manifesto, published in French in art brut magazine Revue Trakt, Alexey Parygin outlined the main theses of the concept. Later, he wrote and published a number of texts clarifying the author’s philosophy, where he outlined the conceptual components and visual markers of his idea.

Two groups of wooden objects—Masks and Signs—formed the material basis of the performances.

Masks are the main element of the performances Fire, Water, Earth held in a number of countries: Russia, Finland, Poland, Croatia, Montenegro, Tunisia, etc. The man with the mask is a counterpoint to the culture-nature opposition. The artist, working with the nude body, installs himself (or a model) in natural and urban environments, acting as a marker of the zone of conflict between the natural and the artificial.

The totem signs were made as self-sufficient sculptural objects, modules of mobile installations. The compositions are a plastic improvisation. Their structure, like the engraving itself, is generally borrowed from nature, reminiscent of the cunning moves of woodworm beetles on the surface of trees.

Appealing to the language of proto-art as a tool most adequate to the program tasks, the project enters into a resonant dialogue-conflict with modern society, its ideologies, ideals, and mythology.

Exhibitions

 Four squared. — Museum of Nonconformist Art. Art Center Pushkinskaya 10. St. Petersburg. June 25 — August 28, 2022.
 Mashkerad. — Alexander Shumov Gallery. Moscow. May 13 — June 13, 2021.
 Color on paper. — The Great Hall of the Saint Petersburg Stieglitz State Academy of Art and Design. St. Petersburg. April 12 — 26, 2021.
 Sopromat. — Museum of the avant-garde on Shabolovka. Moscow. February 18 — March 29, 2020.
 Graphics Festival-UNI Graphica 2019. — Krasnodar Regional Art Museum named after F. A. Kovalenko. Krasnodar. September 12 — October 13, 2019.
 Quatrième biennale internationale de poésie visuelle d’Ille sur Tet Catalogne nord. — Ille-sur-Têt. France. June 4—16, 2019.
 Artisterium XII. Annual International Contemporary Art Exhibition and Art Events. — David Kakabadze Fine Art Gallery. Kutaisi, Tbilisi. Georgia. June 11—30, 2019.
 SPb Subjective factor. St. Petersburg: Saint Petersburg Union of Artists. January 29 — February 3, 2019.
 Dualism / Third Baltic Biennale of Book Art — 2018. — St. Petersburg Creative Union of Artists (IFA). St. Petersburg. December 3—14, 2018.
 Biennale New ideas for the city-VIII. — New Exhibition Hall of the State Museum of Urban Sculpture. St. Petersburg. October 15 — November 28, 2018.
 „17. INTERBIFEP“ Mezinárodní bienále festivalu portrétu. — Mezinárodní portrétní galerie.Tuzla. Bosnia and Herzegovina. September 17 — November 2, 2018.
 Made in Japan. — St. Petersburg Creative Union of Artists (IFA). St. Petersburg. June 14—28, 2018.
 Lines and dots. — Art Center Pushkinskaya 10, Gallery "Door". St. Petersburg. — 2018.
 Personajes y otros retratos. — Galería Santa Thekl Atelier. Guatemala. July 5 — August 31, 2018.
 20th Beijing Art Expo. — China International Exhibition Center. Beijing. China. August 31 — September 3, 2017.
 Posturbanism / Human. — Nevsky 20 (rotunda), St. Petersburg. — 2014.
 Pro print. — Nevsky 20 (rotunda), St. Petersburg. 1—18 March 2014.
 Posturbanism / Blow-Up. — Art Center Pushkinskaya 10, Gallery "Door". St. Petersburg. January 12 — February 3, 2013.
 Petersburg 2011. — Central Exhibition Hall Manege. St. Petersburg. 6—26 January 2012.
 Art in the Forest (a series of installations and performances in the natural environment). — Karelian Isthmus. — 2010.

Interview
 „Россия докатилась до новой этики“: художник Парыгин назвал жалобы на „обнажёнку“ в Эрмитаже декларацией варварства. Interview with artist Alexey Parygin. Rosbalt. — 2021, April 8. 19:05.
 Любой мегаполис — это всегда отчасти Вавилон. Interview with artist Alexey Parygin. Rosbalt. — 2020, October 22.
 Новые идеи для города-VIII. Interview with the curators of the exhibition — Anna Kovalevskaya and artist-curator and exhibitor — Alexey Parygin. Radio Petersburg. Transfer "Meetings in Italian St.". 2018, 25 October. Thu. 19.07-19.40.

Bibliography

Articles
 Severyukhin D. Ya. Постурбанизм или архаика будущего. — St. Petersburg art notebooks, # 67, St. Petersburg: AIS, 2021. — P. 63-65.  (RUS)
 Parygin A. B. Постурбанизм как гипотеза. — St. Petersburg art notebooks, #  68,St. Petersburg: AIS, 2022. — P. 255-259.  (RUS)
 Parygin A. B. Постурбанизм — точка невозврата. — St. Petersburg. — 2021.
 Parygin A. B., Ratkyavichyute K. Постурбанизм как неофутуризм. — St. Petersburg art notebooks, # 58, St. Petersburg: AIS, 2020. — P. 103-104.  (RUS)
 Parygin A. B. Постурбанизм как концепция будущего // St. Petersburg art notebooks, # 53, St. Petersburg: AIS, 2019. — P. 236—238. (RUS)
 Paryguine А. Idée et Manifeste [Posturbanisme] // Revue Trakt — Nu. 6; Juin 2018. — Paris. — pp. 26-28. ISSN 2558-3522
 Parygin A. B. Линии и точки. Press release (flyer) for the exhibition February 24 — March 18, 2018. — St. Petersburg. — 2018. — 1 s. (RUS)
 Zamyatin D. N. Постурбанизм, сопространственность, искусство: имажинальноонтологический поворот / XI Иконниковские чтения (материалы научной конференции). 2017. — P. 114-140. (RUS)
 Grigoryants E. I. «Постурбанизм» Алексея Парыгина. — St. Petersburg art notebooks, # 34., St. Petersburg: AIS, 2015. — P. 66–69. (RUS)
 Grigoryants E. I. Искусство постурбанизма // Bulletin of St. Petersburg State University of Technology and Design. — 2015. — # 4, St. Petersburg: SPb GUTD, 2015. — P. 61-64,col. illus. (RUS)
 Parygin A. B. Постурбанизм/ Человек. Exhibition booklet. — St. Petersburg. — 2014. (RUS)
 Parygin A. B. Posturbanism / Blow-Up. Flyer for the exhibition. January 12 — February 3, 2013. — St. Petersburg: Pushkinskaya 10. — 2013. — 1 s. (RUS)
 Parygin A. B. Манифест постурбанизма (Flyer). — СПб. — 2010. — 1 s. (RUS)

Artist's book
 Alexey Parygin Posturban. — Saint Petersburg, 2016.
 Alexey Parygin PostUrbanism Fire. — Saint Petersburg, 2015.
 Alexey Parygin Posturbanism. — Saint Petersburg, 2012.

Exhibition catalogues
 Imago Mundi/ Beyond the Black square. Contemporary Artists from St. Petersburg. Texts: Luciano Benetton, Liliana Malta, Gleb Ershov. — Treviso: Antiga Edizioni, 2021. — 480 pp. — P. 308—309. (English, Russian, Italian) 
 Сопромат/ Group project album. Auth. Comp.: Mathyssen K. Moscow; N. Novgorod: Express. — 2021. — 128 p. pp. 48—49, 74.
 City as Artist's subjectivity. Artist's book project. Catalog. Authors of the articles: Parygin A.B., Markov T.A., Klimova E.D., Borovsky A.D., Severyukhin D.Ya., Grigoryants El., Blagodatov N.I. (Rus & En) — SPb: T. Markov Publishing house. 2020. — 128 p. 
 Artisterium XII. Artisterium On the Road / Catalog (7 notebooks in the cover). Tbilisi: Artisterium. — 2019.
 Nuire № 5. Quatrième biennale internationale de poésie visuelle d’Ille sur Tet Catalogne nord / Catalog. Ille-sur-Têt. — 2019. — 95 p. P. 82.
 5ª Bienal Internacional de Gravura «Lívio Abramo» / Catalog. Araraquara/SP. — 2019. — 23 p.
 СПб Субъективный фактор / Catalog. Auth. int. Art.: A. Dolgushin. SPb. — 2019. — 133 p., ill. pp. 102—103.
 Third International Printmaking Biennial in Cacak / Catalog. Čačak. — 2018. — 105 p., ill. P. 26.
 «17. INTERBIFEP» Mezinárodní bienále festivalu portrétu / Catalog. Tuzla: Mezinárodní portrétní galerie Tuzla. — 2018. — 186 p. P. 130.
 Новые идеи для города — VIII / Exhibition catalogue. Auth. int. Art.: A. A. Kovalevskaya. St. Petersburg: GMGS, 2018. — 56 p., col. ill. S. 30.
 Дуализм. Third Baltic Book Art Biennale / Exhibition catalogue. Auth. int. Art.: I. Grinchel, Parygin A.B., Grigoryants El.. St. Petersburg, 2018. — 100 p., color. ill.
 Книжное пламя / Book fire / International Project of the Miniature Artist's Book / Exhibition Catalogue. Auth. int. Art.: M. Pogarsky. Moscow: Cherry Pie. — 2015. — 116 p., col. ill. P. 102.
 Про принт / Exhibition catalogue. Auth. int. Art.: V. Borisov. SPb. — 2014. — 24 p., color. ill. pp. 16—17.

Works

References

Conceptual art
21st century in the arts
Art movements